Tornus is a genus of sea snails, marine gastropod mollusks in the family Tornidae. 

This genus is represented in the fossil record, notably in the London Clay Formation.

Species 
Species in the genus Tornus include:

 Tornus aemilii Rolán & Rubio, 2002
 Tornus africanus Adam & Knudsen, 1969
 Tornus anselmoi Rolán & Rubio, 2002
 †Tornus aquitanicus Lozouet, 1998 
 Tornus atomus (Morelet, 1882)
 Tornus attenuatus Rolán & Rubio, 2002
 Tornus aupouria (Powell, 1937)
 Tornus axiotimus (Melvill & Standen, 1903) 
 Tornus calianus (Dall, 1919)
 Tornus cancellatus Adam & Knudsen, 1969
 Tornus caraboboensis (Weisbord, 1962)
 Tornus carinatus (A. Adams, 1863)
 † Tornus dysporistus Lozouet, 1998 
 Tornus erici Rolán & Rubio, 2002
 Tornus galaensis M. Fekih & L. Gougerot, 1975 
 Tornus garrawayi Adam & Knudsen, 1969
 Tornus greyana (J.T.C. Ratzeburg, 1848)
 Tornus jullieni Adam & Knudsen, 1969
 Tornus laevicarinatus Hansson, 1985 
 Tornus leloupi Adam & Knudsen, 1969
 Tornus maoria (Powell, 1937)
 Tornus mienisi van Aartsen, Carrozza & Menkhorst, 1998
 † Tornus pedemontanus Pavia, 1980 
 † Tornus primitivus Moroni & Ruggieri, 1985 
 Tornus propinquus Rubio & Rolán, 2018
 Tornus propinquus Rubio & Rolán, 2018
 Tornus rachelae Rolán & Rubio, 2002
 Tornus ryalli Rolán & Rubio, 2002
 Tornus schrammii (P. Fischer, 1857)
 †Tornus sinuosus Lozouet, 1998 
 Tornus subangulatus (A. Adams, 1863)
 Tornus subcarinatus (Montagu, 1803)
 † Tornus superlatus Landau, Ceulemans & Van Dingenen, 2018 
 Tornus trochulus (A. Adams, 1863)
 Tornus umbilicorda Rolán & Rubio, 2002

 Names brought to synonymy
 † Tornus basiglabra M. Fekih & L. Gougerot, 1975: synonym of † Tornus pedemontanus Pavia, 1980
  † Tornus canui de Morgan, 1920: synonym of † Discopsis canui (de Morgan, 1920)  (original combination)
  † Tornus dollfusi Cossmann, 1918: synonym of  † Tornus subcarinatus (Montagu, 1803)
  † Tornus falunicus de Morgan, 1920: synonym of  † Discopsis falunica (de Morgan, 1920)  (original combination)
 Tornus fragilis Sars, 1878: synonym of  Rugulina fragilis (Sars, 1878)
 † Tornus canui de Morgan, 1920: synonym of † Discopsis canui (de Morgan, 1920)  (original combination)
 † Tornus dollfusi Cossmann, 1918 : synonym of † Tornus subcarinatus (Montagu, 1803)
 † Tornus falunicus de Morgan, 1920 : synonym of † Discopsis falunica (de Morgan, 1920)  (original combination)
 Tornus planus (A. Adams, 1850): synonym of  Sigaretornus planus (A. Adams, 1850)
 † Tornus pontileviensis de Morgan, 1920: synonym of † Discopsis pontileviensis (de Morgan, 1920) (original combination)
 † Tornus praecursor (Tate, 1873): synonym of † Valvata praecursor Tate, 1873  ( superseded combination)
 † Tornus subcirculus Cossmann & Peyrot, 1917: synonym of † Circulus subcirculus (Cossmann & Peyrot, 1917) (original combination)
 Tornus tornaticus Moolenbeek & Hoenselaar, 1995: synonym of Ponderinella tornatica (Moolenbeek & Hoenselaar, 1995) (original combination)

See also 
 List of marine gastropod genera in the fossil record

References 

 Adam, W.; Knudsen, J. (1969). Quelques genres de mollusques prosobranches marins ou peu connus de l'Afrique occidentale. Bulletin de l'Institut Royal des Sciences Naturelles de Belgique. 44(27): 1-69
 Rolán E. & Rubio F. (2002). The family Tornidae (Gastropoda, Rissooidea) in the East Atlantic. Reseñas Malacologicas. 13 (Suplemento), 98 pp. Sociedad Española de Malacología.
 Rubio, F.; Fernández-Garcés, R.; Rolán, E. (2011). The family Tornidae (Gastropoda, Rissooidea) in the Caribbean and neighboring areas. Iberus. 29(2), 1-230
 Rubio & Rolán, (2018), Nine new molluscs (Gastropoda: Truncatelloidea: Tornidae: Vitrinellidae)from the Tropical Indo-Pacific; NOVAPEX 19(1): 1-20, 10 March 2018

External links 
 Turton W. & Kingston J.F. 1830. The natural history of the District. In: N.T. Carrington, The Teignmouth, Dawlish and Torquay Guide, 2

Tornidae